Loveday is a name, thought to derive from Old English Leofdaeg or alternatively Lief Tag.  Leofdaeg is composed of the words leof meaning dear/beloved or precious and daeg meaning day. Lief Tag literally translates to Love Day, and is thought to have existed in eastern Britain from around the 7th century.

Loveday was used as a given name during the Middle Ages in England, which has now become confined to Cornwall, where it survives in occasional use by people such as Loveday Jenkin.  The name was originally bestowed, either formally or as a nickname, with reference to a Love Day, a day appointed for a meeting between enemies and litigants with a view to an amicable settlement.  The name is now only given to girls.

Variant spellings include:

 Daylof
 Dayluue
 Leuare
 Leudedai
 Leue
 Leued
 Leuedaei
 Liuedai
 Loue
 Louedai
 Loueday
 Lovdie
 Love
 Lovedaia
 Loveday
 Lovedaya
 Loveta
 Lovota
 Lowdy
 Lowdie
 Luueday
 Luuedei
 Luveday
 Leofdaeg
 Lief Tag

First name
 Loveday Carlyon, Cornish politician
 Loveday Enyinnaya, Nigerian football player
 Loveday Jenkin, Cornish politician
Fictional characters
 Loveday Brooke, in books by Catherine Louisa Pirkis
 Loveday Carne, the daughter of Drake and Morwenna in the Poldark books by Winston Graham
 Loveday Carey-Lewis, in the novel Coming Home by Rosamunde Pilcher
 Loveday De Noir, one of the main characters of the film The Secret of Moonacre

Surname
 Alan Loveday (1928–2016), New Zealand-born violinist
 Alexander Loveday, British economist
 Catherine Loveday, British campaigner for war memorials
 Clare Loveday, South African classical music composer
 David Loveday, English Anglican bishop
 Francis Loveday (1892–1954), English cricketer
 Gary Loveday (born 1964), English cricketer
 Helen Loveday, Swiss university lecturer
 Henry Herbert Loveday, British railway administrator
 John Loveday (disambiguation), several people
 Leigh Loveday, Welsh video game writer and designer
 Mark Loveday, British businessman
 Papis Loveday, Senegalese model and fashion entrepreneur
 Pete Loveday, British cartoonist
 Peter Loveday, Australian singer/songwriter
 Richard John Loveday (1818–1883), South Australian surveyor
 Ron Loveday (1900–1987), Australian politician
 Thomas Loveday, 16th-century MP for Gloucester
 Thomas Loveday (university administrator), British professor of philosophy, later a university administrator
 Zack Loveday, fictional character from the soap opera Hollyoaks

References